Sheetal Mallar (born 23 April 1974) is an Indian fashion model from Mumbai. She is now also a contemporary Indian photographer. See her official website here. She won the Femina Look of the Year and the Elite Look of the Year in 1994.

Early life
Mallar was born in Mumbai, India. Her parents hail from a Tulu speaking Billava (Poojary) family  Padubidri, Mangalore, and her father is a lawyer. She went to Canossa Convent, Mumbai, pursued her B.Com at Sydenham College, Mumbai, and discontinued in her third year.

Modeling career
Mallar's first shoot was for Danabhai Jewellers. She was placed among the 12 finalists in the Elite Supermodel Contest held in 1994 and worked for Armani and Fendi. She is the face of Maybelline cosmetics.

Personal life
Mallar was married to Italian tennis player Mosé Navarra for three years.

References

External links
 

Italian Hindus
Living people
Mangaloreans
1974 births
Tulu people
Female models from Mumbai